The 2011–12 Danish Cup was the 58th season of the Danish Cup competition. After being rebranded, the tournament will be the first under the new name DBU Pokalen (The DBU Cup). The winner of the competition qualifies for the play-off round of the 2012–13 UEFA Europa League.

Overview

 From regional qualification
 Including 2 byes

First round
Normally, 96 teams – would have been drawn into the first round, but because of the mergers of Kolding FC (with Vejle Boldklub to Vejle Boldklub Kolding) and Ølstykke FC (with Stenløse BK to SC Egedal), only 94 teams were eligible for the draw and two byes were given out. Matches are scheduled for 9–11 August but may be rescheduled for television coverage.

Jutland, north

Blokhus FC received a bye into the second round.

Jutland, middle

Skovbakken IK received a bye into the second round.

Jutland, south

Funen

Zealand and Lolland-Falster

Copenhagen, North Zealand and Bornholm

Second round
Number 5–10 from the previous season's Superliga and the two promoted teams from the previous season's First Division will enter in the second round. The matches will be played from 30 August – 1 September.

West

East

Third round

Fourth round

Quarter-finals

Semi-finals

First Legs

Second Legs

Final

References

External links

2011-12
2011–12 domestic association football cups
Cup